Wurld may refer to:
Wurld Media, American company 1999-2008
Wurld (musician) (born 1987), Nigerian musician

See also

World (disambiguation)